Planetary nomenclature, like terrestrial nomenclature, is a system of uniquely identifying features on the surface of a planet or natural satellite so that the features can be easily located, described, and discussed. Since the invention of the telescope, astronomers have given names to the surface features they have discerned, especially on the Moon and Mars. To found an authority on planetary nomenclature, the International Astronomical Union (IAU) was organized in 1919 to designate and standardize names for features on Solar System bodies.

How names are approved by the IAU 

When images are first obtained of the surface of a planet or satellite, a theme for naming features is chosen and a few important features are named, usually by members of the appropriate IAU task group (a commonly accepted planet-naming group). Later, as higher resolution images and maps become available, additional features are named at the request of investigators mapping or describing specific surfaces, features, or geologic formations. Anyone may suggest that a specific name be considered by a task group. If the members of the task group agree that the name is appropriate, it can be retained for use when there is a request from a member of the scientific community for a name of a specific feature. Names that pass review by a task group are submitted to the IAU Working Group for Planetary System Nomenclature (WGPSN). Once approved by the WGPSN, names are considered official and can be used on maps and in publications. They are also listed in the Gazetteer of Planetary Nomenclature.

IAU rules and conventions 

Names adopted by the IAU must follow various rules and conventions established and amended through the years by the Union. These include:

Nomenclature is a tool and the first consideration should be to make it simple, clear, and unambiguous.
In general, official names will not be given to features whose longest dimensions are less than 100 meters, although exceptions may be made for smaller features having exceptional scientific interest.
The number of names chosen for each body should be kept to a minimum. Features should be named only when they have special scientific interest, and when the naming of such features is useful to the scientific and cartographic communities at large.
Duplication of the same surface feature name on two or more bodies, and of the same name for satellites and minor planets, is discouraged. Duplications may be allowed when names are especially appropriate and the chances for confusion are very small.
Individual names chosen for each body should be expressed in the language of origin. Transliteration for various alphabets should be given, but there will be no translation from one language to another.
Where possible, the themes established in early solar system nomenclature should be used and expanded on.
Solar system nomenclature should be international in its choice of names. Recommendations submitted to the IAU national committees will be considered, but final selection of the names is the responsibility of the International Astronomical Union. Where appropriate, the WGPSN strongly supports an equitable selection of names from ethnic groups, countries, and gender on each map; however, a higher percentage of names from the country planning a landing is allowed on landing site maps.
No names having political, military or (modern) religious significance may be used, except for names of political figures prior to the 19th century.
Commemoration of persons on planetary bodies should not normally be a goal in itself, but may be employed in special circumstances and is reserved for persons of high and enduring international standing. Persons being so honored must have been deceased for at least three years.
When more than one spelling of a name is extant, the spelling preferred by the person, or used in an authoritative reference, should be used. Diacritical marks are a necessary part of a name and will be used.
Ring and ring-gap nomenclature and names for newly discovered satellites are developed in joint deliberation between WGPSN and IAU Commission 20. Names will not be assigned to satellites until their orbital elements are reasonably well known or definite features have been identified on them.
Accessible and authoritative sources, including Internet sources, are required for adopted names. Wikipedia is not sufficient as a source, but may be useful for identifying appropriate sources.

In addition to these general rules, each task group develops additional conventions as it formulates an interesting and meaningful nomenclature for individual planetary bodies.

Naming conventions 

Names for all planetary features include a descriptor term, with the exception of two feature types. For craters, the descriptor term is implicit. Some features named on Io and Triton do not carry a descriptor term because they are ephemeral.

In general, the naming convention for a feature type remains the same regardless of its size. Exceptions to this rule are valleys and craters on Mars and Venus; naming conventions for these features differ according to size.

One feature classification, regio, was originally used on early maps of the Moon and Mercury (drawn from telescopic observations) to describe vague albedo features. It is now used to delineate a broad geographic region.

Named features on bodies so small that coordinates have not yet been determined are identified on drawings of the body that are included in the IAU Transactions volume of the year when the names were adopted. Satellite rings and gaps in the rings are named for scientists who have studied these features; drawings that show these names are also included in the pertinent Transactions volume. Names for atmospheric features are informal at present; a formal system will be chosen in the future.

The boundaries of many large features (such as terrae, regiones, planitiae and plana) are not topographically or geomorphically distinct; the coordinates of these features are identified from an arbitrarily chosen center point. Boundaries (and thus coordinates) may be determined more accurately from geochemical and geophysical data obtained by future missions.

During active missions, small surface features are often given informal names. These may include landing sites, spacecraft impact sites, and small topographic features, such as craters, hills, and rocks. Such names will not be given official status by the IAU, except as provided for by Rule 2 above. As for the larger objects, official names for any such small features would have to conform to established IAU rules and categories.

Descriptor terms (feature types)

Categories for naming features on planets and satellites

Mercury

Venus 

All but three features on Venus are named after female personages (goddesses and historical or mythological women). These three exceptions were named before the convention was adopted, being respectively Alpha Regio, Beta Regio, and Maxwell Montes which is named after James Clerk Maxwell.

The Moon

Mars and martian satellites

Mars 

When space probes have landed on Mars, individual small features such as rocks, dunes, and hollows have often been given informal names. Many of these are frivolous: features have been named after ice cream (such as Cookies N Cream); cartoon characters (such as SpongeBob SquarePants and Patrick); and '70s music acts (such as ABBA and the Bee Gees).

Deimos 

Features on Deimos are named after authors who wrote about Martian satellites. There are currently two named features on Deimos Swift crater and Voltaire crater after Jonathan Swift and Voltaire who predicted the presence of Martian moons.

Phobos 

All features on Phobos are named after scientists involved with the discovery, dynamics, or properties of the Martian satellites or people and places from Jonathan Swift's Gulliver's Travels.

Satellites of Jupiter

Amalthea

People and places associated with the Amalthea myth

Thebe

Features on Thebe are named after people and places associated with the Thebe myth. There is only one named feature on Thebe Zethus Crater.

Io

Europa

Ganymede

Callisto

Satellites of Saturn

Janus
People from myth of Castor and Pollux (twins)

Epimetheus
People from myth of Castor and Pollux (twins)

Mimas

People and places from Malory's Le Morte d'Arthur legends (Baines translation)

Enceladus

People and places from Burton's Arabian Nights

Tethys

People and places from Homer's Odyssey

Dione

Locations from Roman mythology, or people and places from Virgil's Aeneid

Rhea

People and places from creation myths

Titan

Hyperion

Sun and Moon deities

Iapetus

People and places from Sayers' translation of Chanson de Roland; the only exception is Cassini Regio, which is named after its discoverer, Giovanni Cassini.

Phoebe

Satellites of Uranus 
Satellites of Uranus are named for characters from the works of William Shakespeare.

Puck

Mischievous (Pucklike) spirits (class)

Miranda

Characters, places from Shakespeare's plays

Ariel

Light spirits (individual and class)

Umbriel

Dark spirits (individual)

Titania

Female Shakespearean characters, places

Oberon

Shakespearean tragic heroes and places

Small satellites
There are currently no named features on Uranian small satellites, however the naming convention is heroines from plays by Shakespeare and Pope.

Satellites of Neptune

Proteus

Features on Proteus are to be named after water-related spirits, gods or goddesses who are neither Greek nor Roman. The only named feature on Proteus is crater Pharos.

Triton

Geological features on Triton should be assigned aquatic names, excluding those which are Roman and Greek in origin. Possible themes for individual descriptor terms include worldwide aquatic spirits, famous terrestrial fountains or fountain locations, terrestrial aquatic features, famous terrestrial geysers or geyser locations and terrestrial islands.

Nereid

There are currently no named features on Nereid. When features are discovered, they are to be named after individual nereids.

Small satellites

Features on other satellites of Neptune, once discovered, should be named after gods and goddesses associated with Neptune/Poseidon mythology or generic mythological aquatic beings.

Pluto and satellites 

In February 2017, the IAU approved the following themes for surface features on Pluto and its satellites:

Pluto 

 Gods, goddesses, and other beings associated with the Underworld from mythology, folklore and literature.
 Names for the Underworld and for Underworld locales from mythology, folklore and literature.
 Heroes and other explorers of the Underworld.
 Scientists and engineers associated with Pluto and the Kuiper Belt.
 Pioneering space missions and spacecraft.
 Historic pioneers who crossed new horizons in the exploration of the Earth, sea and sky.

Charon 

 Destinations and milestones of fictional space and other exploration.
 Fictional and mythological vessels of space and other exploration.
 Fictional and mythological voyagers, travellers and explorers.
 Authors and artists associated with space exploration, especially Pluto and the Kuiper Belt.

Nix 
 Deities of the night.

Hydra 
 Legendary serpents and dragons.

Kerberos 
 Dogs from literature, mythology, and history.

Styx 
 River gods.

Asteroids

1 Ceres

4 Vesta

243 Ida

(243) Ida I Dactyl

951 Gaspra

253 Mathilde

433 Eros

25143 Itokawa

See also
 Astronomical naming conventions
 Lists of geological features of the Solar System
 List of adjectivals and demonyms of astronomical bodies
 Naming of moons
 Selenography
 Toponymy, the scientific study of place-names (toponyms), their origins, meanings, use and typology.

Notes

References

Citations

Sources 

 
 .

Further reading

External links
Gazetteer of Planetary Nomenclature IAU Working Group for Planetary System Nomenclature (WGPSN)
'Planetary Names: How do we come up with them?', Planetary Society weblog article by Rosaly Lopes, IAU WGPSN member
Members of the WGPSN
Planetary Maps: Visualization and Nomenclature Cartographica 41/2 2006
Development of a Local Toponym System at the Mars Desert Research Station Cartographica 42/2 2007
APTN National News interviews Planetary Cartographer John Koulouris,(Esq.) on I.A.U. officially adopted Planetary Surface Feature Nomenclature attributed to Aboriginal Peoples' Cultures, People and Places
Planetary Atlas of Venus in the Hellenic (Greek) and English Languages with I.A.U. adopted surface feature nomenclature as of 1984 created by: John A. Koulouris,(Esq.)

Nomenclature
Encodings
Astronomical nomenclature
Planetary geology